Mount Tambora, or Tomboro, is an active stratovolcano in West Nusa Tenggara, Indonesia. Located on Sumbawa in the Lesser Sunda Islands, it was formed by the active subduction zones beneath it.

Tambora violently erupted in a series of eruptions beginning 5 April, 1815, culminating in the largest eruption in recorded human history and the largest of the Holocene (10,000 years ago to present). The magma chamber under Tambora had been drained by previous eruptions and underwent several centuries of dormancy as it refilled. Volcanic activity reached a peak that year, culminating in an explosive eruption. Although estimates vary, the death toll was at least 71,000 people. The eruption contributed to global climate anomalies in the following years, while 1816 became known as the "year without a summer" because of the impact on North American and European weather. In the Northern Hemisphere, crops failed and livestock died, resulting in the worst famine of the century.

Geographical setting 

Mount Tambora, also known as Tomboro, is situated in the northern part of Sumbawa island, part of the Lesser Sunda Islands. It is a segment of the Sunda Arc, a chain of volcanic islands that make up the southern chain of the Indonesian archipelago. Tambora forms its own peninsula on Sumbawa, known as the Sanggar peninsula. At the mouth of Saleh Bay there is an islet called Mojo.

Besides the seismologists and vulcanologists who monitor the mountain's activity, Mount Tambora is an area of interest to archaeologists and biologists. The mountain also attracts tourists for hiking and wildlife activities, though in small numbers. The two nearest cities are Dompu and Bima. There are three concentrations of villages around the mountain slope. At the east is Sanggar village, to the northwest are Doro Peti and Pesanggrahan villages, and to the west is Calabai village.

There are two routes of ascent to the caldera. This location is only one hour from the caldera, and usually serves as a base camp from which volcanic activity can be monitored. The second route starts from Pancasila village at the northwest of the mountain and is only accessible on foot. The  hike from Pancasila at  elevation to the caldera of the volcano takes approximately 14 hours with several stops (pos) en route to the top. The trail leads through dense jungle with wildlife such as Elaeocarpus batudulangii, Asian water monitor, reticulated python, hawks, orange-footed scrubfowl, pale-shouldered cicadabird (Coracina dohertyi), brown and scaly-crowned honeyeater, yellow-crested cockatoo, yellow-ringed white-eye, helmeted friarbird, wild boar, Javan rusa and crab-eating macaques.

History of Mount Tambora

Geological history

Formation 

Sumbawa Island is flanked to the north and south by oceanic crust. Estimates for the onset of the volcanism at Mount Tambora range from 57 to 43 ka. The latter estimate published in 2012 is based on argon dating of the first pre-caldera lava flows. The formation of Tambora drained a large magma chamber pre-existing under the mountain. The Mojo islet was formed as part of this geological process in which Saleh Bay first appeared as a sea basin about 25,000 years BP.

A high volcanic cone with a single central vent formed before the 1815 eruption, which follows a stratovolcano shape. The volcano frequently erupted lava, which descended over steep slopes. Tambora has produced trachybasalt and trachyandesite rocks which are rich in potassium. The volcanics contain phenocrysts of apatite, biotite, clinopyroxene, leucite, magnetite, olivine and plagioclase, with the exact composition of the phenocrysts varying between different rock types. Orthopyroxene is absent in the trachyandesites of Tambora. Olivine is most present in the rocks with less than 53 percent SiO2, while it is absent in the more silica-rich volcanics, characterised by the presence of biotite phenocrysts. The mafic series also contain titanium magnetite and the trachybasalts are dominated by anorthosite-rich plagioclase. Rubidium, strontium and phosphorus pentoxide are especially rich in the lavas from Tambora, more than the comparable ones from Mount Rinjani. The lavas of Tambora are slightly enriched in zircon compared with those of Rinjani.

The magma involved in the 1815 eruption originated in the mantle and was further modified by melts derived from subducted sediments, fluids derived from the subducted crust and crystallization processes in magma chambers. 87Sr86Sr ratios of Mount Tambora are similar to those of Mount Rinjani, but lower than those measured at Sangeang Api. Potassium levels of Tambora volcanics exceed 3 weight percent, placing them in the shoshonite range for alkaline series.

Since the 1815 eruption, the lowermost portion contains deposits of interlayered sequences of lava and pyroclastic materials. Approximately 40% of the layers are represented in the  lava flows. Thick scoria beds were produced by the fragmentation of lava flows. Within the upper section, the lava is interbedded with scoria, tuffs, pyroclastic flows and pyroclastic falls. Tambora has at least 20 parasitic cones and lava domes, including Doro Afi Toi, Kadiendi Nae, Molo and Tahe. The main product of these parasitic vents is basaltic lava flows.

Eruptive history 
Radiocarbon dating has established that Mount Tambora had erupted three times during the current Holocene epoch before the 1815 eruption, but the magnitudes of these eruptions are unknown. Their estimated dates are 3910 BC ± 200 years, 3050 BC and 740 AD ± 150 years. An earlier caldera was filled with lava flows starting from 43,000 years BP; two pyroclastic eruptions occurred later and formed the Black Sands and Brown Tuff formations, the last of which was emplaced between about 3895 BC and 800 AD.

In 1812, Mount Tambora became highly active, with its maximum eruptive intensity occurring in April 1815. The magnitude was 7 on the Volcanic Explosivity Index (VEI) scale, with a total tephra ejecta volume of up to 1.8 × 1011 cubic metres. Its eruptive characteristics included central vent and explosive eruptions, pyroclastic flows, tsunamis and caldera collapse. This eruption had an effect on global climate. Volcanic activity ceased on 15 July 1815. Activity resumed in August 1819—a small eruption with "flames" and rumbling aftershocks, and was considered to be part of the 1815 eruption. This eruption was recorded at 2 on the VEI scale.

Around 1880 ± 30 years, eruptions at Mount Tambora have been registered only inside the caldera. It created small lava flows and lava dome extrusions; this was recorded at two on the VEI scale. This eruption created the Doro Api Toi parasitic cone inside the caldera.

Mount Tambora is still active and minor lava domes and flows have been extruded on the caldera floor during the 19th and 20th centuries. The last eruption was recorded in 1967. However, it was a gentle eruption with a VEI of 0, which means it was non-explosive. Another very small eruption was reported in 2011. In August 2011, the alert level for the volcano was raised from level I to level II after increased activity was reported in the caldera, including earthquakes and steam emissions.

1815 eruption

Chronology of the eruption 
Before 1815, Mount Tambora was dormant for several centuries as hydrous magma cooled gradually in a closed magma chamber. In 1812, the crater began to rumble and generated a dark cloud.

On the morning of 6 April 1815, volcanic ash began to fall in East Java, with faint detonation sounds lasting until 10 April.
 
The eruptions intensified at about 7:00 p.m. on the 10th. Three columns of flame rose and merged as the mountain became a flowing mass of liquid fire. The eruption column collapsed, producing hot pyroclastic flows that cascaded down the mountain and towards the sea on all sides of the peninsula, wiping out the village of Tambora. Loud explosions were heard until the next evening, 11 April. The veil of ash spread as far as West Java and South Sulawesi, while a "nitrous odor" was noticeable in Batavia. The heavy tephra-tinged rain did not recede until 17 April. Analysis of various sites on Mount Tambora using ground-penetrating radar has revealed alternations of pumice and ash deposits covered by the pyroclastic surge and flow sediments that vary in thickness regionally.

The eruption is estimated to have had a Volcanic Explosivity Index of 7. It had 4–10 times the energy of the 1883 Krakatoa eruption. An estimated  of pyroclastic trachyandesite was ejected, weighing approximately 1.4×1014 kg. The density of fallen ash in Makassar was 636 kg/m3.

The 1815 Tambora eruption is the largest and most devastating observed eruption in recorded history; a comparison with other major eruptions is listed below.

Aftermath 
One pumice raft was found in the Indian Ocean, near Calcutta, on 1 and 3 October 1815. Clouds of thick ash still covered the summit on 23 April. Explosions ceased on 15 July, although smoke emissions were still observed as late as 23 August. Flames and rumbling aftershocks were reported in August 1819, four years after the event.

A moderate tsunami struck the shores of various islands in the Indonesian archipelago on 10 April, with waves reaching  in Sanggar at around 10 p.m. Longitudinal winds spread these fine particles around the globe, creating optical phenomena. Between 28 June and 2 July, and between 3 September and 7 October 1815, prolonged and brilliantly coloured sunsets and twilights were frequently seen in London, England. Most commonly, pink or purple colours appeared above the horizon at twilight and orange or red near the horizon.

Fatalities 
The number of fatalities has been estimated by various sources since the nineteenth century. Swiss botanist Heinrich Zollinger traveled to Sumbawa in 1847 and recollected witness accounts about the 1815 eruption of Tambora. In 1855, he published estimates of directly killed people at 10,100, mostly from pyroclastic flows. A further 37,825 were numbered having died from starvation on Sumbawa island. On Lombok, another 10,000 died from disease and hunger. Petroeschevsky (1949) estimated that about 48,000 and 44,000 people were killed on Sumbawa and Lombok, respectively. Several authors have used Petroeschevsky's figures, such as Stothers (1984), who estimated 88,000 deaths in total. However, Tanguy et al. (1998) considered Petroeschevsky's figures based on untraceable sources, so developed an estimate based solely on two primary sources: Zollinger, who spent several months on Sumbawa after the eruption, and the notes of Sir Stamford Raffles, Governor-General of the Dutch East Indies during the event. Tanguy pointed out that there may have been additional victims on Bali and East Java because of famine and disease, and estimated 11,000 deaths from direct volcanic action and 49,000 from post-eruption famine and epidemics. Oppenheimer (2003) estimated at least 71,000 deaths, and numbers as high as 117,000 have been proposed.

Global effects 

The 1815 eruption released 10 to 120 million tons of sulphur into the stratosphere, causing a global climate anomaly. Different methods have been used to estimate the ejected sulfur mass: the petrological method, an optical depth measurement based on anatomical observations, and the polar ice core sulfate concentration method, which calibrated against cores from Greenland and Antarctica.

In the spring and summer of 1816, a persistent stratospheric sulfate aerosol veil, described then as a "dry fog", was observed in the northeastern United States. It was not dispersed by wind or rainfall, and it reddened and dimmed sunlight to an extent that sunspots were visible to the naked eye. Areas of the northern hemisphere suffered extreme weather conditions and 1816 became known as the "year without a summer". After 4 June 1816, when there were frosts in Connecticut, cold weather expanded over most of New England. On 6 June 1816, it snowed in Albany, New York and Dennysville, Maine. Similar conditions persisted for at least three months, ruining most crops across North America while Canada experienced extreme cold.

That year became the second-coldest year in the northern hemisphere since 1400, while the 1810s were the coldest decade on record, a result of Tambora's eruption and other suspected volcanic events between 1809 and 1810. (See sulfate concentration chart.) Surface-temperature anomalies during the summers of 1816, 1817 and 1818 were −0.51, −0.44 and −0.29 °C, respectively. Along with a cooler summer, parts of Europe experienced a stormier winter, and the Elbe and Ohře Rivers froze over a period of twelve days in February 1816. As a result, prices of wheat, rye, barley and oats rose dramatically by 1817.

This climate anomaly has been cited as a reason for the severity of the 1816–19 typhus epidemic in southeast Europe and the eastern Mediterranean. In addition, large numbers of livestock died in New England during the winter of 1816–1817, while cool temperatures and heavy rains led to failed harvests in the British Isles. Families in Wales travelled long distances as refugees, begging for food. Famine was prevalent in north and southwest Ireland, following the failure of wheat, oat and potato harvests. The crisis was severe in Germany, where food prices rose sharply. Demonstrations at grain markets and bakeries, followed by riots, arson and looting, took place in many European cities. It was the worst famine of the 19th century.

Culture 

A human settlement obliterated by the Tambora eruption was discovered in 2004. That summer, a team led by Haraldur Sigurðsson with scientists from the University of Rhode Island, the University of North Carolina at Wilmington and the Indonesian Directorate of Volcanology began an archaeological dig in Tambora. The team excavated  of deposits of pumice and ash. The scientists used ground-penetrating radar to locate a small buried house which contained the remains of two adults, bronze bowls, ceramic pots, iron tools and other artifacts. Tests revealed that objects had been carbonized by the heat of the magma. Sigurdsson dubbed the find the "Pompeii of the East", and media reports referred to the "Lost Kingdom of Tambora". Sigurdsson intended to return to Tambora in 2007 to search for the rest of the villages, and hopefully to find a palace. Many villages in the area had converted to Islam in the 17th century, but the structures uncovered so far do not show Islamic influence.

Based on the artifacts found, such as bronzeware and finely decorated china possibly of Vietnamese or Cambodian origin, the team concluded that the people were well-off traders. The Sumbawa people were known in the East Indies for their horses, honey, sappan wood (for producing red dye), and sandalwood (for incense and medications). The area was thought to be highly productive agriculturally.

The language of the Tambora people was lost with the eruption. Linguists have examined remnant lexical material, such as records by Zollinger and Raffles, and established that Tambora was not an Austronesian language, as would be expected in the area, but possibly a language isolate, or perhaps a member of one of the families of Papuan languages found  or more to the east.

The eruption is captured in latter-day folklore, which explains the cataclysm as divine retribution. A local ruler is said to have incurred the wrath of Allah by feeding dog meat to a hajji and killing him. This is expressed in a poem written around 1830:

Ecosystem 

A team led by the Swiss botanist Heinrich Zollinger arrived on Sumbawa in 1847. Zollinger sought to study the area of eruption and its effects on the local ecosystem. He was the first person after the eruption to ascend the summit, which was still covered by smoke. As Zollinger climbed, his feet sank several times through a thin surface crust into a warm layer of powder-like sulfur. Some vegetation had regrown, including trees on the lower slope. In August 2015 a team of Georesearch Volcanedo Germany followed the way used by Zollinger and explored this way for the first time since 1847. Because of the length of the distance to be travelled on foot, the partly very high temperatures and the lack of water it was a particular challenge for the team of Georesearch Volcanedo.

Resettlement of the area began in 1907, and a coffee plantation was established in the 1930s in the Pekat village on the northwestern slope. The rain forest was discovered by a Dutch team, led by Koster and de Voogd in 1933. From their accounts, they started their journey in a "fairly barren, dry and hot country", and then they entered "a mighty jungle" with "huge, majestic forest giants". At , the trees became thinner in shape. Above , they found Dodonaea viscosa flowering plants dominated by Casuarina trees. On the summit was sparse Edelweiss and Wahlenbergia.

An 1896 survey records 56 species of birds including the crested white-eye. Several other zoological surveys followed and found other bird species, with over 90 bird species discoveries in this period, including yellow-crested cockatoos, Zoothera thrushes, Hill mynas, green junglefowl and rainbow lorikeets are hunted for the cagebird trade by the local people. Orange-footed scrubfowl are hunted for food. This bird exploitation has resulted in population declines, and the yellow-crested cockatoo is nearing extinction on Sumbawa island.

A commercial logging company began to operate in the area in 1972, posing a threat to the rain forest. Another part of the rain forest is used as a hunting ground. In between the hunting ground and the logging area, there is a designated wildlife reserve where deer, water buffalos, wild pigs, bats, flying foxes and species of reptiles and birds can be found. In 2015, the conservation area protecting the mountain's ecosystem was upgraded to a national park.

Exploration of the caldera floor 
Zollinger (1847), van Rheden (1913) and W. A. Petroeschevsky (1947) could only observe the caldera floor from the crater rim. In 2013, a German research team (Georesearch Volcanedo Germany) for the first time carried out a longer expedition into this caldera, about 1300 m deep, and with the help of a native team climbed down the southern caldera wall, reaching the caldera floor while experiencing extreme conditions. The team stayed in the caldera for nine days. People had reached the caldera floor only in a few cases as the descent down the steep wall is difficult and dangerous, subject to earthquakes, landslides and rockfalls. Moreover, only relatively short stays on the caldera floor had been possible because of logistical problems, so that extensive studies had been impossible. The investigation program of Georesearch Volcanedo on the caldera floor included researching the visible effects of smaller eruptions which had taken place since 1815, gas measurements, studies of flora and fauna and measurement of weather data. Especially striking was the relatively high activity of Doro Api Toi ("Gunung Api Kecil" means "small volcano") in the southern part of the caldera and the gases escaping under high pressure on the lower north-east wall. Besides the team discovered near the Doro Api Toi a lavadome which had not yet been mentioned in scientific studies. The team called this new discovery "Adik Api Toi (Indonesian "adik": younger brother). Later this lavadome was called by the Indonesians "Doro Api Bou" ("new volcano"). This lavadome probably appeared in 2011/2012 when there was an increased seismic activity and probably volcanic activity on the caldera floor  (there is no exact information about the caldera floor at that time). In 2014 the same research team carried out a further expedition into the caldera and set a new record: over 12 days the investigations of 2013 were continued.

Monitoring 

Indonesia's population has been increasing rapidly since the 1815 eruption. In 2010, the population of the country reached 238 million people, of which 57.5%  concentrated on the island of Java. An event as significant as the 1815 eruption would impact about eight million people.

Seismic activity in Indonesia is monitored by the Directorate of Volcanology and Geological Hazard Mitigation with the monitoring post for Mount Tambora located at Doro Peti village. They focus on seismic and tectonic activity by using a seismograph. There has been no significant increase in seismic activity since the 1880 eruption. Monitoring is continuously performed inside the caldera, with a focus on the parasitic cone Doro Api Toi.

The directorate created a disaster mitigation map for Mount Tambora, which designates two zones for an eruption: a dangerous zone and a cautious zone. The dangerous zone identifies areas that would be directly affected by pyroclastic flows, lava flows or pyroclastic falls. It includes areas such as the caldera and its surroundings, a span of up to  where habitation is prohibited. The cautious zone consists of land that might be indirectly affected, either by lahar flows and other pumice stones. A river, called Guwu, at the southern and northwest part of the mountain is also included in the cautious zone.

Panorama

References

Notes

Bibliography

External links 

 
 
 WikiSatellite view at WikiMapia
 Google Earth view

Stratovolcanoes of Indonesia
Subduction volcanoes
Volcanoes of Sumbawa
Mountains of Indonesia
Active volcanoes of Indonesia
VEI-7 volcanoes
Calderas of Indonesia
Two-thousanders of Asia
Pleistocene stratovolcanoes
Holocene stratovolcanoes